

Politicians

Wied, Prince of Albania –  Sovereign of the Principality of Albania
Princess Sophie of Albania –  Princess of Albania 
Elyesa Bazna – Secret agent for Nazi Germany during World War II
Zana Ramadani  -  German politician, feminist activist and author
Princess Marie Eleonore of Albania –  Princess of Albania 
Carol Victor –  Princ of Albania
Shqiprim Arifi –  Politician and businessman

Cinema

Gedeon Burkhard  -  German film and television actor
Heinrich Schmieder  -  German actor
Nur Fettahoğlu  -  Turkish-German actress
Bettina Moissi  -  German stage and film actress
Blerim Destani  -  actor and film producer
İrem Helvacıoğlu - Turkish-Albanian actress

Musicians

Miriam Cani  -  singer, member of Preluders
Njomza – singer
 Gent - Rapper
Ardian Bujupi  -  singer, DSDS contestant
Colos  -  German rapper
Azet  -  German-Albanian rapper
Alida Hisku  -  German-Albanian singer
Vanessa Krasniqi  -  German singer
Dhurata Dora  -  German-Albanian singer
Butrint Imeri  -  German-Albanian singer
Dardan -  German rapper
Fifi – singer
DJ Gimi-O, German-Albanian Rapper

Medicine
Fatmir Dalladaku  -  German cardiac surgeon
Bujar Bukoshi - LDK Politician and surgeon

Authors
Anila Wilms  -  German writer
Lindita Arapi  -  German writer and journalist

Arts and Entertainment
Adela Demetja  -   Albanian-German independent art curator

Sports

Football 

Fatmire Bajramaj  - commonly known as Lira Bajramaj, footballer of the German women's national football team
Shkodran Mustafi  - Footballer, currently playing for Levante UD and the Germany national football team
Mërgim Mavraj  -  Footballer, currently playing for Hamburger SV and the Albania national football team
Donis Avdijaj  -  Footballer, currently playing for Schalke 04 and the Kosovo national football team
Mërgim Berisha  -  Kosovo Albanian professional footballer who plays as a forward for German club 1. FC Magdeburg,
Florent Muslija  -  German-Albanian footballer who plays as a midfielder for Hannover 96
Leart Paqarada  -  German-Albanian footballer
Besar Halimi  -  German-Albanian footballer
Meritan Shabani  -  German footballer who plays as an attacking midfielder for Bayern Munich
Valdet Rama  -  Footballer, currently playing for Yanbian Funde F.C.
Jürgen Gjasula  -  Footballer, currently playing for SpVgg Greuther Fürth and the Albania national football team
Bajram Sadrijaj  -  Footballer, currently retired due to injury, last played for Borussia Dortmund
Faton Toski  -  Footballer
Alban Meha  -  Footballer
Valentina Limani  -  Kosovo Albanian professional footballer
Enis Bunjaki  -  Professional footballer
Shergo Biran  -  German football player
Arianit Ferati  -  Professional footballer
Ali Ibrahimaj  -  German footballer who plays as a midfielder for KFC Uerdingen 05
Enis Alushi  -  Kosovo Albanian professional footballer who plays as a midfielder for the Kosovo national team
Agim Zeka  -  Albanian professional footballer who plays as a right winger for Portuguese club Varzim on loan from French club Lille
Valmir Sulejmani  -  German-Albanian footballer
Jürgen Gjasula  -  Albanian professional footballer
Klaus Gjasula  -  German-Albanian footballer
Dren Hodja  -  Albanian professional footballer
Ndriqim Halili  -  German–Albanian footballer
Bashkim Renneke  -  German–Albanian professional footballer
Elvis Rexhbeçaj  -  German footballer
Mërgim Neziri  -  German–Albanian footballer
Kushtrim Lushtaku  -  German–Albanian footballer
Florent Muslija  -  German footballer
David Nreca-Bisinger - Kosovo German professional footballer
Dren Feka  -  Kosovo Albanian professional footballer
Agim Zeka  -  Albanian professional footballer
Edon Zhegrova  -  Kosovar professional footballer
Bledar Hajdini  -  Kosovar professional footballer
Tim Civeja  -  German footballer who plays as a central midfielder for FC Augsburg
Blendi Idrizi  -  Kosovo-Albanian footballer who plays as a attacking midfielder for German club Schalke 04

Boxing 
Arber Bellegu - German-Kosovar professional boxer and MMA trainer
Valdet Gashi  -  German kickboxer and Muay Thai fighter
Luan Krasniqi  -  Boxer
Besim Kabashi  -  Kosovar-German kickboxer who competed in the light heavyweight, cruiserweight and heavyweight divisions
Mirdi Limani  -  Albanian former kickboxer who competed in the welterweight division
Robin Krasniqi  -  German professional boxer
Juergen Uldedaj  -  German professional boxer

Other Sports 
Lirim Zendeli  - German-Albanian racing driver
Kristian Bećiri  - German-Croatian handball player

Business and civil society

Nicolas Berggruen  -  Philanthropist and investor

References

Germany